Bambur (also Romanized as Bambūr, Bambor, Bamboor, and Bambowr; also known as Bambū and Kalāteh-ye Bām Bār) is a village in Arabkhaneh Rural District, Shusef District, Nehbandan County, South Khorasan Province, Iran. At the 2006 census, its population was 91, in 27 families.

References 

Populated places in Nehbandan County